Neusser Straße/Gürtel is an interchange station on the Cologne Stadtbahn lines 12, 13 and 15, located in the Cologne district of Nippes, Germany. The station lies on the Neusser Straße at the place where the Cologne Belt road (Gürtel) would have intersected it, if this section of it had been built. Even though the street was never built, the station carries the street name in its name.

The station was opened in 1974 and consists of an elevated and an underground station, each with two side platforms and two rail tracks.

See also 
 List of Cologne KVB stations

External links 

 station info page 

Cologne KVB stations
Nippes, Cologne
Railway stations in Germany opened in 1974